This is the first edition of the tournament.

Aslan Karatsev and Yaraslav Shyla won the title, defeating Mate Pavić and Michael Venus in the final, 7–6(7–4), 4–6, [10–5].

Seeds

Draw

References
 Main Draw

Batman Cup - Doubles